G3P may refer to:

Chemistry
 Glyceraldehyde 3-phosphate, or 3-phosphoglyceraldehyde
 Glycerol 3-phosphate

Other uses
 Global public–private partnership (GPPP)

See also
 3GP
 3PG, 3-Phosphoglyceric acid
 GP3 (disambiguation)
 P3G